Federico Gabriel Losas (born 28 March 2002) is an Argentine footballer currently playing as a goalkeeper for Chacarita Juniors.

Career statistics

Club

Began playing for Chacarita Juniors at age 11. 

South America U15 Winner San Juan Argentina Nov 2017. 
Four Nations U16 Runner Up Mexico City Oct 2018. 
South America U17 Winner Lima Apr 2019. 
Granatkin Memorial U17 Winner Saint Petersburg Jun 2019. 
Played for Argentina at U17 World Cup Brazil 2019. 

Played more than 50 international cups with Argentina U15, U16 and U17. 

In April 19th 2021 he made his first team debut with a cleansheet in a host game vs Belgrano (2-0). He became the youngest goalkeeper playing in Primera Nacional, keeping this record for 14 months .He was also the youngest goalkeeper playing a full time match including the two first categories in Argentine football.

References

2002 births
Living people
Footballers from Buenos Aires
Argentine footballers
Argentina youth international footballers
Association football goalkeepers
Primera Nacional players
Chacarita Juniors footballers